Bury Hill is an area of West Sussex, England, north of Arundel and southwest of Bury. In the 18th century, its name may have sometimes been spelled Berry or Bery Hill, and it was used as a venue for cricket matches.

Its earliest known definite use for cricket was in June 1730 for a match between the 2nd Duke of Richmond's XI and Sir William Gage's XI. In August 1745, it was used for a match between a Sussex side and a Surrey team, the third in a series of matches between the two sides. The area appears to have remained in use for cricket matches until the 1770s, with references to matches which were scheduled to be played on the hill in 1771 and 1774.

References

Bibliography
McCann TJ (ed) (2004) Sussex Cricket in the Eighteenth Century. Lewes: Sussex Record Society, vol. 88.

1702 establishments in England
Cricket grounds in Sussex
Defunct cricket grounds in England
Defunct sports venues in West Sussex
English cricket venues in the 18th century
History of Sussex
Sports venues completed in 1702
Hills of West Sussex